Jacques Marguerite Pilotte de La Barollière (28 November 1746, Lunéville - 1 December 1827, Nîmes) was a French general under the First Republic and First Empire.

External links
http://www.culture.gouv.fr/public/mistral/leonore_fr?ACTION=CHERCHER&FIELD_1=COTE&VALUE_1=LH%2F2162%2F67

1746 births
1827 deaths
People from Lunéville
Barons of the First French Empire
Chevaliers of the Légion d'honneur